Stepan Tymofiyovych Poltorak is a Ukrainian general who served as the Minister of Defence of Ukraine from 14 October 2014 until 29 August 2019. Previously he was the commander of the Internal Troops of Ukraine and National Guard of Ukraine. Poltorak's rank was General of the army of Ukraine. From 1 January 2019, Poltorak remained the country's defense minister as a civilian, after resigning from military service in October 2018. Poltorak resigned at the request of newly inaugurated president Volodymyr Zelensky on 20 May 2019.

Biography

Poltorak was born on 11 February 1965 in the village Vesela Dolyna (located in the Bolhrad Raion, Odesa Oblast). He has served in the military since August 1983. Poltorak is a graduate from Ordzhonikidzevsky highest military command college of the Ministry of Internal Affairs of the USSR.

Poltorak has a Ph.D. In 2003 he successfully defended his thesis on "Pedagogical conditions of the skills of the commander unit in the future officers of the Interior Ministry of Ukraine."

In March 2002 Poltorak was appointed head of the Academy of the Interior Ministry of Ukraine in Kharkiv.

On 28 February 2014 acting President of Ukraine Oleksandr Turchynov appointed Poltorak commander of the Internal Troops of Ukraine.

When the National Guard of Ukraine was reestablished on 13 March 2014, Poltorak became its first commander on 15 April 2014.

On 14 October 2014, Ukraine's Verkhovna Rada approved Poltorak's appointment as Ukraine's Minister of Defence.
, replacing Valeriy Heletey, who was appointed head of the State Security Administration after President Petro Poroshenko accepted his resignation.

President Poroshenko accepted Poltorak's resignation from military service on 13 October 2018. Poltorak stayed on as Minister of Defence.

Poltorak resigned at the request of newly inaugurated president Volodymyr Zelensky on 20 May 2019. His official tenure as Defence Minister ended on 29 August 2019 when Andriy Zahorodniuk was appointed his successor.

Family and personal life
Poltorak is married to Inna (who is two years younger than him) and has an adult son called Ihor. His wife is a captain at Poltorak former posting, the Academy of the Interior Ministry of Ukraine in Kharkiv.

Awards and decorations

References

External links

Biography on the official website of Kharkiv 

1965 births
People from Odesa Oblast
Living people
Generals of the Army (Ukraine)
Ivan Chernyakhovsky National Defense University of Ukraine alumni
Defence ministers of Ukraine
Heads of universities and colleges in Ukraine
Recipients of the Order of Bohdan Khmelnytsky, 3rd class
People of the National Guard of Ukraine
Ukrainian military personnel of the war in Donbas
Recipients of the Order of Bohdan Khmelnytsky, 1st class
Recipients of the Order of Bohdan Khmelnytsky, 2nd class